Bangladesh and Israel do not maintain diplomatic relations. Bangladesh said that it will not recognize Israel until there is an independent Palestine. Some reports and statistics revealed that Bangladesh and Israel maintain some trade relations indirectly and sometimes secretly, although the government always denies these allegations.

Country comparison

Diplomacy
Bangladesh is one of 28 UN member states that does not recognize the state of Israel. It is one of several countries that officially bans its citizens from traveling to Israel and does not accept Israeli passports. In November 2003, Bangladeshi journalist Salah Choudhury was arrested for attempting to fly to Tel Aviv, arraigned for "sedition, treason, and blasphemy", and sentenced to a seven-year prison term. Bangladesh officially supports a sovereign Palestinian state and "an end to Israel's illegal occupation of Palestine".

In a September 2011 statement published in The Jerusalem Post, an Israeli government spokesperson said, "We have no conflict with Bangladesh. We want dialogue. We want people-to-people relations. We welcome the religious-minded people of Bangladesh to visit the holy land of Jerusalem". Israel fruitlessly "sought a relationship with Bangladesh" after they had established "full diplomatic relations with China and India in 1992". Bangladeshi prime minister Sheikh Hasina said in 2014, "We have been continuing our support to the Palestinians and occupation of their land by the Israelis is never acceptable".

In late May 2021, Bangladesh removed "except Israel" from their passport to meet the "international standard" from an earlier version which said "This passport is valid for all countries of the world except Israel". The removal was only from their e-passport and removal from machine readable passports (MRP) is on process. Though the term was removed from the passport, Bangladesh did not remove the ban on traveling to Israel with Bangladeshi passport.

Trade
Bangladesh maintains a ban on trade with Israel even though both countries are members of the World Trade Organization. In recent years however, it is found that Bangladeshi products are exported to Israel through the United States, the European Union or other third countries.

Spyware purchase
In February 2021, an Al-Jazeera investigation report titled "All the Prime Minister's Men" alleged that Bangladeshi military intelligence secretly bought Israeli-made mobile phone surveillance and manipulation equipment that can be used to simultaneously monitor hundreds of people. The report also claimed that some Bangladeshi military officers were trained by Israeli tech experts at a warehouse in Hungary. Bangladesh Army denied these allegations in an official statement.

Bangladesh Liberation War
Israel was one of the first nations to recognize the independent Bangladesh in February 1972.  Both the Israeli Government and the Israeli general public supported the aspirations of the Bengali people during the Bangladesh Liberation War in 1971. After the independence of Bangladesh, the newly formed country was quickly recognized by Israel on 4 February 1972. However the Government of Bangladesh officially rejected the Israeli recognition. On behalf of the Bangladeshi Government, the then Foreign Minister of Bangladesh, Khondaker Mostaq Ahmad, issued a letter saying this recognition was not acceptable.

2006 Lebanon War
In the immediate aftermath of the 2006 Lebanon War, Bangladesh offered to send battalions of its infantrymen to help with the UN peacekeeping force, but Israel rejected it stating that Bangladesh does not recognize Israel. Although Israel rejected the country's participation, Bangladesh was one of first countries whose troops reached the shores of south Lebanon. Whereas western nations, such as the original leader and top contributor to Lebanon, France, delayed their deployment. As of May 2015, Bangladesh has 326 peacekeepers participating in UNIFIL in Lebanon.

Allegation of Mossad connection 
In May 2016, Bangladesh Prime Minister Sheikh Hasina alleged that opposition parties BNP and Jamaat-e-Islami Bangladesh have joined with Israeli national intelligence agency Mossad to overthrow her government through a coup after it had been reported that Aslam Chowdhury, the joint secretary general of BNP met the Israeli politician Mendi N. Safadi during a visit to India. Aslam claimed that the meeting was accidental.

On 7 June 2016, Bangladeshi Home Minister Asaduzzaman Khan alleged that the main opposition party BNP has link to the recent fundamentalists attacks in Bangladesh and these attacks are part of a wider conspiracy that also involved Mossad, the national intelligence agency of Israel. Israeli Foreign Ministry spokesman referred to the allegations as "utter drivel."

References

 
Israel
Bilateral relations of Israel